Jason William Dent (born June 12, 1980) is a retired American mixed martial artist. A professional from 2003 until 2012, he fought in the UFC, King of the Cage, and was a competitor on SpikeTV's The Ultimate Fighter: United States vs. United Kingdom.

Background
Dent's training in martial arts began at age 13 with karate. Just before earning his black belt he moved onto Muay Thai and Brazilian jiu-jitsu.

Mixed martial arts career

Early career
Dent made his professional MMA debut at Extreme Combat Challenge's Assault event on May 31, 2003, where he defeated Tim Newland with a triangle choke.  He won his first professional championship a few months later at Next Level Fighting's first event on September 13, 2003.  Once again, using a triangle choke, Dent defeated Nick Spencer for the NLF Lightweight Championship.

Ultimate Fighting Championship
He fought in a number of other local events and was eventually offered a chance to fight in a UFC match.  In his UFC debut at UFC 63, Dent lost by unanimous decision to Roger Huerta.  He was given second chance with a match against Gleison Tibau at UFC 68 which he lost by unanimous decision.  Having lost both matches, Dent was cut from the UFC roster.

The Ultimate Fighter
Dent went back to the local MMA circuit and won five of his next six fights winning three championships along the way.  He tried out for The Ultimate Fighter: United States vs. United Kingdom and was accepted.  In the preliminary elimination round, he defeated Robert Browning, securing himself a spot in The Ultimate Fighter house. In episode eight, Dent defeated Team UK lightweight Jeff Lawson by Anaconda Choke in the second round, earning him a spot in the semi-finals. Dent lost by decision in the semifinals to Ross Pearson.

Dent won his post TUF fight against Cameron Dollar by submission in the first round due to an anaconda choke. The fight was at the TUF 9 Finale and Dent was awarded the Submission of the Night bonus for the choke.

Dent faced George Sotiropoulos on November 21, 2009 at UFC 106. Dent fought George on the Prelim card, the fight started off with an exchange where both fighters were engaging but after some time Sotiropoulos took down Dent and controlled him on the ground for the duration of round one. At the start of round two, Dent once again got taken down while Sotiropoulos was working for a kimura, but was unable to lock it in. While still holding Dent's arm he instead went for an armbar which finished the fight in the second round.

Dent was released from the UFC for the second time after his loss at UFC 106.

Post-UFC
With his latest stint in the UFC now behind him, Dent took a fight with NAAFS Middleweight Champion Chris Lozano at a catchweight of 170 pounds for the NAAFS Superfight Title. Despite suffering a broken arm sustained from blocking a kick in the 1st round, Dent traded shots with Lozano for four full rounds before the fight was ended. He returned to defend his NAAFS Lightweight belt against the Interim Champion, Bellator Featherweight Tournament finalist Daniel Mason-Straus more than a year later. While Dent again traded shots with his opponent throughout, he lost a decision on all three judges' scorecards.

Based on research by an MMA writer] Dent owns the record for most career submissions in MMA for a UFC veteran from Ohio.

Personal life
Dent owns the GriffonRawl MMA Academy in Mentor, Ohio, and previously hosted an MMA oriented radio talk show on WWGK Radio (AM 1540 KNR2) in Cleveland.

Championships and accomplishments
Extreme Fighting Challenge
EFC Lightweight Championship (One time)
International Fighting & Boxing League
IFBL Lightweight Championship (One time)
IFBL Welterweight Championship (One time)
North American Allied Fighting Championship
NAAFS Lightweight Championship (One time)
Next Level Fighting
NLF Lightweight Championship (One time)
Ultimate Fighting Championship
Fight of the Night (One time) vs. Roger Huerta 
Submission of the Night (One time) vs. Cameron Dollar

Mixed martial arts record

|-
| Loss
| align=center| 22–13
| Rustam Khabilov 
| Decision (unanimous)
| Pure MMA: Next Episode 
| 
| align=center| 3
| align=center| 5:00
| Wilkes Barre, Pennsylvania, United States
| 
|-
| Win
| align=center| 22–12
| Paul Bird 
| Submission (armbar)
| World War Fighting Championship 6
| 
| align=center| 2
| align=center| 3:19
| Clive, Iowa
| 
|-
| Loss
| align=center| 21–12
| Daniel Mason-Straus
| Decision (unanimous) 
| NAAFS: Caged Fury 15
| 
| align=center| 5
| align=center| 5:00
| Cleveland, Ohio, United States
| 
|-
| Loss
| align=center| 21–11
| Chris Lozano
| TKO (retirement)
| NAAFS: Fight Night in the Flats 6
| 
| align=center| 4
| align=center| 5:00
| Cleveland, Ohio, United States
| 
|-
| Loss
| align=center| 21–10
| George Sotiropoulos
| Submission (armbar)
| UFC 106
| 
| align=center| 2
| align=center| 4:36
| Las Vegas, Nevada, United States
| 
|-
| Win
| align=center| 21–9
| Cameron Dollar
| Submission (anaconda choke)
| The Ultimate Fighter: United States vs. United Kingdom Finale
| 
| align=center| 1
| align=center| 4:46
| Las Vegas, Nevada, United States
| 
|-
| Win
| align=center| 20–9
| Matt Shaw
| Submission (americana)
| IFBL: Fight Night 13
| 
| align=center| 2
| align=center| 3:41
| Niles, Ohio, United States
| Welterweight bout; won the IFBL Welterweight Championship.
|-
| Win
| align=center| 19–9
| Nick Sorg
| Submission (armbar)
| GFS: Fight Nite in the Flats IV
| 
| align=center| 2
| align=center| 4:33
| Cleveland, Ohio, United States
| Won the NAAFS Lightweight Championship.
|-
| Win
| align=center| 18–9
| Harris Sarmiento
| Submission (anaconda choke)
| IFBL: Fight Night 10
| 
| align=center| 5
| align=center| 1:49
| Niles, Ohio, United States
| Won the IFBL Lightweight Championship.
|-
| Loss
| align=center| 17–9
| Torrance Taylor
| Decision (split)
| NAAFS: Caged Fury 3
| 
| align=center| 5
| align=center| 5:00
| Cleveland, Ohio, United States
| For the NAAFS Lightweight Championship.
|-
| Win
| align=center| 17–8
| Israel Giron
| Submission (guillotine choke)
| EC: Fights
| 
| align=center| 2
| align=center| 1:47
| Monterrey, Mexico
| 
|-
| Win
| align=center| 16–8
| Luke Spencer
| TKO (punches)
| Superior Fight Night 3
| 
| align=center| 2
| align=center| 2:55
| Cleveland Ohio, United States
| 
|-
| Win
| align=center| 15–8
| Mike Bogner
| Submission (anaconda choke)
| NAAFS: Fight Night in the Flats 3
| 
| align=center| 1
| align=center| 0:58
| Cleveland, Ohio, United States
| 
|-
| Loss
| align=center| 14–8
| Gleison Tibau
| Decision (unanimous)
| UFC 68
| 
| align=center| 3
| align=center| 5:00
| Columbus, Ohio, United States
| 
|-
| Loss
| align=center| 14–7
| Roger Huerta
| Decision (unanimous)
| UFC 63: Hughes vs. Penn
| 
| align=center| 3
| align=center| 5:00
| Anaheim, California, United States
| Fight of the Night.
|-
| Win
| align=center| 14–6
| Kolo Koka
| Submission (armbar)
| Icon Sport: Mayhem vs Lawler
| 
| align=center| 3
| align=center| 1:07
| Honolulu, Hawaii, United States
| 
|-
| Win
| align=center| 13–6
| Luke Spencer
| Submission (triangle choke)
| NAAFS: Fight Night in the Flats 2
| 
| align=center| 3
| align=center| 0:43
| Cleveland, Ohio, United States
| 
|-
| Win
| align=center| 12–6
| Joe Voisin
| Submission (guillotine choke)
| KOTC: Drop Zone
| 
| align=center| 1
| align=center| 4:50
| Mt. Pleasant, Michigan, United States
|Welterweight bout.
|-
| Win
| align=center| 11–6
| Clint Zeedyk
| TKO (punches)
| NAAFS: Caged Vengeance 1
| 
| align=center| 2
| align=center| 1:40
| Cleveland, Ohio, United States
| 
|-
| Loss
| align=center| 10–6
| Brandon Garner
| Submission (triangle choke)
| KOTC: Shock and Awe
| 
| align=center| 1
| align=center| 2:49
| Alberta, Canada
|Welterweight bout.
|-
| Win
| align=center| 10–5
| Josh Souder
| TKO (cut)
| GFS: Fight Night in the Flats 1
| 
| align=center| 1
| align=center| 1:57
| Cleveland, Ohio, United States
| 
|-
| Win
| align=center| 9–5
| Primo Luciano
| TKO (submission to punches)
| Extreme Fighting Challenge 11
| 
| align=center| 1
| align=center| N/A
| Columbus, Ohio, United States
| Return to Lightweight; defended the EFC Lightweight Championship.
|-
| Loss
| align=center| 8–5
| Paulo Dantas
| Decision (unanimous)
| KOTC 48: Payback
| 
| align=center| 2
| align=center| 5:00
| Cleveland, Ohio, United States
|Featherweight debut.
|-
| Win
| align=center| 8–4
| Joe Voisin
| Submission (triangle choke)
| ECC: Ho Ho Ho KO
| 
| align=center| 2
| align=center| 1:17
| Muncie, Indiana, United States
|Welterweight bout.
|-
| Loss
| align=center| 7–4
| Jeff Curran
| Decision (unanimous)
| Xtreme Fighting Organization 3
| 
| align=center| 3
| align=center| 5:00
| McHenry, Illinois, United States
| 
|-
| Loss
| align=center| 7–3
| Ryan Schultz
| TKO (punches)
| APEX: Genesis
| 
| align=center| 1
| align=center| 2:00
| Quebec, Canada
|Return to Lightweight.
|-
| Win
| align=center| 7–2
| Tom Kirk
| Submission (triangle choke)
| ECC: Brawl at the Hall
| 
| align=center| 3
| align=center| 2:43
| Muncie, Indiana, United States
| 
|-
| Win
| align=center| 6–2
| D'Angelo Nickle
| TKO (submission to punches)
| Northern Kentucky FC
| 
| align=center| 1
| align=center| N/A
| Covington, Kentucky, United States
| 
|-
| Loss
| align=center| 5–2
| Tetsuji Kato
| Decision (unanimous)
| SuperBrawl 35
| 
| align=center| 3
| align=center| 5:00
| Honolulu, Hawaii, United States
| 
|-
| Win
| align=center| 5–1
| Matt Brady
| Submission (armbar)
| KOTC 34: Ohio
| 
| align=center| 1
| align=center| N/A
| Canton, Ohio, United States
| 
|-
| Win
| align=center| 4–1
| Davy Gibson
| Submission (armbar)
| Extreme Combat Challenge
| 
| align=center| 1
| align=center| N/A
| Anderson, Indiana, United States
| 
|-
| Win
| align=center| 3–1
| Billy Rush
| TKO (submission to punches)
| International Combat Events 5
| 
| align=center| 1
| align=center| 3:49
| Middletown, Ohio, United States
|Welterweight debut.
|-
| Win
| align=center| 2–1
| Nick Spencer
| Submission (triangle choke)
| Next Level Fighting
| 
| align=center| 3
| align=center| 2:20
| Steubenville, Ohio, United States
| Won the Next Level Fighting Lightweight Championship.
|-
| Loss
| align=center| 1–1
| Antoine Skinner
| Decision (unanimous)
| ECC: Mayhem in Muncie
| 
| align=center| 3
| align=center| 5:00
| Muncie, Indiana, United States
| 
|-
| Win
| align=center| 1–0
| Tim Newland
| Submission (triangle choke)
| ECC: Assault
| 
| align=center| 3
| align=center| 3:15
| Anderson, Indiana, United States
|

References

External links
 
 
 January 25 interview with Jason Dent, owner of GriffonRawl MMA Academy

Living people
1980 births
American male mixed martial artists
Mixed martial artists from Ohio
Lightweight mixed martial artists
Mixed martial artists utilizing karate
Mixed martial artists utilizing Muay Thai
Mixed martial artists utilizing Brazilian jiu-jitsu
American male karateka
American practitioners of Brazilian jiu-jitsu
People awarded a black belt in Brazilian jiu-jitsu
American Muay Thai practitioners
People from Madison, Ohio
Ultimate Fighting Championship male fighters